Fidobank (formerly SEB Bank) was a bank of Ukraine that until 2012 belonged to the Swedish SEB Group.

It was registered at the National Bank of Ukraine on October 2, 1991 under the name AGIO Bank. It used to be known as Ukrpostachbank (Ukrainian SSR). This bank was acquired by SEB Vilniaus bankas in January 2005 and later renamed SEB Bank. In late 2007 SEB acquired Factorial Bank with offices in Kharkiv and the East Ukraine. Factorial bank was incorporated as a department of SEB Bank during 2008 - 2009.

Today the SEB Group owns only a life insurance company in Ukraine.

In 2012 SEB Group sold its banking business in Ukraine to a Cyprus off-shore company "Ignace Marketing Limited" (20%) and a consulting company "Finance Analit Service" (80%) (belongs to "Ignace Marketing Limited" through "Deviza"). Ignace Marketing Limited through number of other off-shore companies belong to Oleksandr Adarich.

Fido bank also acquired Erste Bank Ukraine AT (formerly Bank Prestige) from the Austria based Erste Group.

Bank Prestige was founded by former owner of Bank Aval after the sale of last to the Raiffeisen International.

See also 

List of banks in Ukraine

Notes

External links
 SEB Bank's official homepage

Defunct banks of Ukraine
Banks established in 1991
1991 establishments in Ukraine
Banks disestablished in 2016
2016 disestablishments in Ukraine